Sven Thiele (born 12 May 1969 in Merseburg) is a German former wrestler who competed in the 1996 Summer Olympics, in the 2000 Summer Olympics, and in the 2004 Summer Olympics.

References

External links
 

1970 births
Living people
Olympic wrestlers of Germany
Wrestlers at the 1996 Summer Olympics
Wrestlers at the 2000 Summer Olympics
German male sport wrestlers
Wrestlers at the 2004 Summer Olympics
People from Saxony-Anhalt